Club Atlético Cerro, usually known simply as Cerro, is a Uruguayan professional football club based in Montevideo that currently plays in the Uruguayan Primera División. Founded in 1922, the club plays its home games at Estadio Luis Tróccoli.

Uruguay's second most important derby is played between Cerro and Rampla Juniors, called "Clásico de la Villa". It is only behind the Uruguayan Clásico between Peñarol and Nacional.

History 
The club was founded on 1 December 1922. The Uruguayan Segunda División was founded in 1942, and Cerro was one of its founders. It spent five years there, and was promoted to the Primera División in 1947, where it stayed for 50 consecutive years until 1997, when the club was deducted points due to an incident with Nacional fans.

Cerro came close to winning the league title in 1960. It finished runner-up to Peñarol, and lost in a heated final to them 3–1. Cerro was considered as Uruguay's third biggest club in the 1960s, because they finished third in the league four consecutive years between 1965 and 1968.

In 1963, Cerro had an international tour through Europe. Their first match was played on 23 May in Romania, a 2–0 loss against Progresul București. Their next match was a 2–0 win against Ştiinţa Timişoara. On 9 June Cerro beat Chernomorets Odessa 2–0; Chernomorets had beat Inter Milan and Flamengo, so this was seen as a very unexpected result. On 14 July Cerro began their tour in South Africa with a match against a local Durban side, winning 2–1. Three days later they beat Cape Town FC 4–0, and on 20 July they drew the South African national team 2–2. Their tour ended with a 3–0 win against the Rhodesia national team. 

By defeating Defensor Sporting in a league play-off in December 1994, Cerro qualified for the 1995 Copa Libertadores, their first time participating in the competition. The Estadio Luis Tróccoli was renovated to meet the regulations, including the construction of four lighting poles. Cerro had one victory in the campaign, defeating Argentine club Independiente 1–0 at home, and finished last in the group stage.

Cerro was relegated after finishing second to last in the 2005–06 Uruguayan Primera División, but won the 2006–07 second division and made an immediate return. 

After winning the 2009 Liguilla Pre-Libertadores, Cerro qualified for their second Copa Libertadores in their history: the 2010 Copa Libertadores. At home they played in the Estadio Centenario and the Estadio Atilio Paiva Olivera. The club finished third in their group, with 2 wins, 2 draws, and 2 losses.

Cerro participated in the 2017 Copa Libertadores, where they were eliminated in the second qualifying stage by Chilean club Unión Española. 

The following year, the club participated in the 2018 Copa Sudamericana, its first ever Copa Sudamericana appearance. Cerro began the tournament by beating Peruvian club Sport Rosario 0–2 on aggregate in the first stage. It was eliminated in the second stage by Brazilian club Bahia 3–1 on aggregate (2–0 and 1–1). 

Cerro participated in the Copa Sudamericana again for the 2019 edition, being eliminated by Montevideo Wanderers in the second stage.

Imported to USA
Cerro was one of the clubs imported to the United Soccer Association, a former professional soccer league featuring teams from the United States and Canada; the club played as the New York Skyliners. The league survived only one season (1967). All the teams in the league were imported from Europe and South America.

Titles

Professional 
Segunda División Uruguay (3): 1946, 1998, Apertura 2006
Tercera División Uruguay (2): 1940, 1941
Liguilla Pre-Libertadores (1): 2009

Friendly / Amateur
Tercera Extra: 1 (1923)
División Intermedia: 1 (1924)
Copa Montevideo: 1 (1985)
Torneo Presentación: 1 (1988)
Campeonato Integración: 1 (1993)

Performance in CONMEBOL competitions
Copa Libertadores: 3 appearances

1995: First Round
2010: Second Round
2017: Qualifying stages

Copa Sudamericana: 2 appearances

2018: Second Stage
2019: Second Stage

Current squad

Managerial history

 Washington Etchamendi
 Enrique Fernández
 José Sasía
 Ondino Viera (1965)
 Gerardo Pelusso (1993–95)
 Jorge González (Jan 1, 1998 – Dec 31, 2001)
 Gerardo Pelusso (Jan 1, 2003 – Dec 31, 2003)
 Roland Marcenaro (Jan 20, 2004 – June 24, 2004)
 Julio Balerio (May 16, 2005 – March 5, 2006)
 Julio Acuña (March 6, 2006 – Dec 31, 2006)
 Jorge González (Aug 1, 2006 – June 30, 2008)
 Pablo Repetto (July 1, 2008 – Feb 25, 2009)
 Richard Martínez (interim) (Feb 2009)
 Eduardo Mario Acevedo (Feb 2009 – Aug 09)
 Guillermo Sanguinetti (Aug 13, 2009 – Dec 2, 2009)
 Pablo Repetto (Dec 15, 2009 – May 23, 2010)
 Alejandro Apud (May 26, 2010 – Feb 15, 2011)
 Ricardo "Tato" Ortíz (Feb 17, 2011 – Dec 21, 2011)
 Hugo Parga (Dec 28, 2011 – May 3, 2012)
 Gabriel Camacho (May 3, 2012 – July 4, 2012)
 Ricardo "Tato" Ortíz (July 5, 2012 – Feb 26, 2013)
 Danilo Baltierra (Feb 27, 2013 – Nov 19, 2013)
 Pablo Alonso (Nov 21, 2013 – March 2, 2014)
 Pablo Rodríguez (March 5, 2014 – Jul 1 2015)
 Eduardo Acevedo (Jul 1, 2015 – Dec 31, 2015)
 Gustavo Ferrín (Jan 4, 2016 – present)

References

External links

 

 
Football clubs in Uruguay
Association football clubs established in 1922
1922 establishments in Uruguay
United Soccer Association imported teams
Villa del Cerro